Individual endurance equestrian at the 2013 Southeast Asian Games was held in Wunna Theikdi Equestrian Field, Naypyidaw, Myanmar on December 10, 2013.

Schedule
All times are Myanmar Standard Time (UTC+06:30)

Results
Legend
EL — Eliminated
RT — Retired
WD — Withdrawn

References 

Equestrian at the 2013 Southeast Asian Games